Olivier Fugen (born 17 October 1970) is a retired French football defender.

Honours

Club
OGC Nice
 Coupe de France: 1997

References

1970 births
Living people
French footballers
OGC Nice players
ES Troyes AC players
Association football defenders
Ligue 1 players
Ligue 2 players